Sir Valentine Browne, 1st Baronet, of Molahiffe (died 1633), owned a large estate in south-west Ireland and was a lawyer who served as high sheriff of County Kerry.

Birth and origins 
Valentine was probably born in the 1580s in Ireland. He was the eldest son of Nicholas Browne and his wife Sheela O'Sullivan Beare. His father was Sir Nicholas Browne of Ross Castle. His paternal grandfather, another Valentine Browne, had come from Croft, and had acquired large estates in Munster, Ireland as surveyor-general.

His mother was a daughter of Eoin the O'Sullivan Beare who had lost his chieftainship to his nephew Donal Cam O'Sullivan Beare who had claimed a right to it by primogeniture. His mother's family were part of the O'Sullivans, a Gaelic Irish clan. His father probably converted to Catholicism to marry his mother.

Early life 
Browne studied law and was admitted to Gray's Inn on 12 March 1612. On 21 December 1621 Browne was created Baronet Browne of Molahiffe. In 1623 Sir Valentine was appointed Sheriff of County Kerry.

First marriage and children 
Sir Valentine married first Alice FitzGerald, fifth daughter of Gerald FitzGerald, 14th Earl of Desmond, the rebel earl, by his second wife, Eleanor Butler.

 
Valentine and Alice had five children, three sons:
Valentine (died 1640), his successor
James, captain in the army
Nicholas, died without issue

—and two daughters of whom nothing further is known.

Second marriage and children 
Sir Valentine married secondly Julia MacCarty, daughter of Charles MacCarthy, 1st Viscount Muskerry.

Valentine and Julia had one son:
Thomas (died 1684), who married his cousin Elizabeth Browne, daughter of Sir John Browne, knight, of Hospital, County Limerick and Barbara Boyle, daughter of John Boyle, Bishop of Cork, and had several daughters including Helen, who married her cousin Nicholas Browne, 2nd Viscount Kenmare

Death and timeline 
Sir Valentine died on 7 September 1633 and was buried in the church of Killarney.

Notes and references

Notes

Citations

Sources 

 
  (for Desmond)
 
  – 1611 to 1625 (for Browne)
  – Canonteign to Cutts (for Clancarty)
  – (for timeline)
  – A to C
 
  – Barons (under Aylmer)

1633 deaths
Baronets in the Baronetage of Ireland
17th-century Irish lawyers
High Sheriffs of Kerry
People from County Kerry
Year of birth uncertain